Alan, Allen or Allan Watson may refer to:

 Alan Cameron Watson (1900–1976), Presbyterian minister
 Alan Watson (legal scholar) (1933–2018), Scottish law and legal history expert
 Alan Watson (magician) (born 1950), New Zealand magician
 Alan Watson (rower) (1929–2007), British Olympic rower
 Alan Andrew Watson (born 1938), British physicist
 Alan Watson, Baron Watson of Richmond (born 1941), South Africa born, British broadcaster and politician
 Allan Watson (born 1948), Scottish footballer
 Allan Watson (American football) (born 1942), Welsh-born placekicker for the 1970 Pittsburgh Steelers
 Allen Watson (born 1970), American baseball player and coach